Barry "B." Wyatt is an American actor. He is known for his collaborative relationship with independent film writer, director, and producer Everett Lewis. Together the two have made three films: The Natural History of Parking Lots, Skin & Bone, and Luster.

External links
 

Year of birth missing (living people)
Living people
American male film actors
Place of birth missing (living people)